Christopher Charles Dickerson (born April 10, 1982) is an American former professional baseball outfielder who played in Major League Baseball (MLB) for the Cincinnati Reds, Milwaukee Brewers, New York Yankees, Baltimore Orioles, and Cleveland Indians between 2008 and 2014.

Career

Amateur
A native of Hollywood, California, Dickerson attended Notre Dame High School. He was drafted out of high school by the New York Yankees in the 32nd round (968th overall) of the 2000 Major League Baseball Draft, but did not sign. He instead attended the University of Nevada, where he played college baseball for the Nevada Wolf Pack baseball team from 2001 through 2003. In 2002, he played collegiate summer baseball with the Brewster Whitecaps of the Cape Cod Baseball League.

Cincinnati Reds
Dickerson was drafted again, in the 16th round (471st overall) of the 2003 MLB Draft, this time by the Cincinnati Reds. He made his Major League debut with the Reds on August 12, 2008. He hit his first career home run on August 15, 2008, against the St. Louis Cardinals.

Dickerson earned a starting job in the outfield with Jay Bruce and Willy Taveras entering the 2009 season, due to Ken Griffey Jr. and Adam Dunn's departures. In the first month of the season, Dickerson was only batting .205 with a homer and 5 RBIs. However, by the end of May he boosted his average to .271. He also was featured in highlight reels for his defensive plays while filling in for Tavares at center field.

In 2010 he batted .205 for Cincinnati.

Milwaukee Brewers
On August 9, 2010, Dickerson was traded to the Milwaukee Brewers for outfielder Jim Edmonds. Dickerson batted .208 with 5 RBIs in 25 games with Milwaukee.

New York Yankees

On March 25, 2011, Dickerson was traded to the New York Yankees in exchange for pitcher Sergio Mitre. He made his Yankees debut on May 17, going 1-for-3 with one run batted in. He was promoted again to the Major Leagues in September.

Dickerson cleared waivers before the 2012 season and was outrighted to the Class-AAA Scranton/Wilkes-Barre Yankees. Dickerson was promoted to the Major Leagues again on September 1, after the rosters expanded. The   Yankees designated Dickerson for assignment, and subsequently released him in January 2013.

Baltimore Orioles
Dickerson signed a minor league contract with the Baltimore Orioles for 2013 and was assigned to the AAA Norfolk Tides. He was called up to Baltimore on April 10, and made his Orioles debut that night. On May 21, Dickerson hit two home runs off Phil Hughes for his first career multi-homer game. On May 31, Dickerson hit the first walk-off home run of his career against Detroit Tigers pitcher José Valverde. Dickerson was designated for assignment on July 19. He batted .238 for Baltimore. After clearing waivers, he was outrighted to the minors. He refused the assignment and became a free agent.

Pittsburgh Pirates
Dickerson signed a minor league contract with the Pittsburgh Pirates on January 6, 2014.

Cleveland Indians
Dickerson was traded to the Cleveland Indians on July 7, 2014. He batted .224/.309/.327 for Cleveland.  He was outrighted off the roster on September 9.

Toronto Blue Jays
On February 21, 2015, he signed a minor league contract with the Toronto Blue Jays. He elected free agency on November 6.

Return to Baltimore
On August 29, 2016, Dickerson signed a minor league deal with the Orioles. He signed another minor league contract with the Orioles on December 16. He elected free agency on November 6, 2017.

Community
Along with fellow baseball player Jack Cassel, Dickerson is a founder of Players for the Planet, a foundation that brings professional athletes together to inspire communities to build awareness of the growing environmental crisis. Several athletes including Chase Utley, Jay Bruce, Ryan Braun, Matt Cassel, and Jacoby Ellsbury are on board to spread the awareness.

References

External links

 

1982 births
Living people
Baseball players from California
Major League Baseball outfielders
Cincinnati Reds players
Milwaukee Brewers players
New York Yankees players
Baltimore Orioles players
Cleveland Indians players
Nevada Wolf Pack baseball players
Billings Mustangs players
Dayton Dragons players
Sarasota Reds players
Potomac Cannons players
Chattanooga Lookouts players
Louisville Bats players
Scranton/Wilkes-Barre Yankees players
Norfolk Tides players
Indianapolis Indians players
African-American baseball players
People from Hollywood, Los Angeles
Notre Dame High School (Sherman Oaks, California) alumni
Surprise Rafters players
Buffalo Bisons (minor league) players
Brewster Whitecaps players
21st-century African-American sportspeople
20th-century African-American people